Linda semiatra is a species of beetle in the family Cerambycidae. It was described by Holzschuh in 2003. It is found in Nepal.

References

semiatra
Beetles described in 2003